This page lists all described species of the spider family Archaeidae accepted by the World Spider Catalog :

A

Afrarchaea

Afrarchaea Forster & Platnick, 1984
 A. ansieae Lotz, 2015 — South Africa
 A. bergae Lotz, 1996 — South Africa
 A. cornuta (Lotz, 2003) — South Africa
 A. entabeniensis Lotz, 2003 — South Africa
 A. fernkloofensis Lotz, 1996 — South Africa
 A. godfreyi (Hewitt, 1919) (type) — South Africa
 A. haddadi Lotz, 2006 — South Africa
 A. harveyi Lotz, 2003 — South Africa
 A. kranskopensis Lotz, 1996 — South Africa
 A. lawrencei Lotz, 1996 — South Africa
 A. neethlingi Lotz, 2017 — South Africa
 A. ngomensis Lotz, 1996 — South Africa
 A. royalensis Lotz, 2006 — South Africa
 A. woodae Lotz, 2006 — South Africa

† Archaea

† Archaea Koch and Berendt, 1854
 † A. bitterfeldensis Wunderlich, 2004 
 † A. compacta Wunderlich, 2004 
 † A. paradoxa Koch and Berendt, 1854 
 † A. pougneti Simon, 1884

† Archaemecys

† Archaemecys Saupe and Selden, 2009 - Archaeinae

Austrarchaea

Austrarchaea Forster & Platnick, 1984
 A. alani Rix & Harvey, 2011 — Australia (Queensland)
 A. aleenae Rix & Harvey, 2011 — Australia (Queensland)
 A. binfordae Rix & Harvey, 2011 — Australia (New South Wales)
 A. christopheri Rix & Harvey, 2011 — Australia (New South Wales)
 A. clyneae Rix & Harvey, 2011 — Australia (Queensland, New South Wales)
 A. cunninghami Rix & Harvey, 2011 — Australia (Queensland)
 A. daviesae Forster & Platnick, 1984 — Australia (Queensland)
 A. dianneae Rix & Harvey, 2011 — Australia (Queensland)
 A. griswoldi Rix & Harvey, 2012 — Australia (Queensland)
 A. harmsi Rix & Harvey, 2011 — Australia (Queensland)
 A. helenae Rix & Harvey, 2011 — Australia (New South Wales)
 A. hoskini Rix & Harvey, 2012 — Australia (Queensland)
 A. judyae Rix & Harvey, 2011 — Australia (Queensland)
 A. karenae Rix & Harvey, 2012 — Australia (Queensland)
 A. mascordi Rix & Harvey, 2011 — Australia (New South Wales)
 A. mcguiganae Rix & Harvey, 2011 — Australia (New South Wales)
 A. milledgei Rix & Harvey, 2011 — Australia (New South Wales)
 A. monteithi Rix & Harvey, 2011 — Australia (New South Wales)
 A. nodosa (Forster, 1956) (type) — Australia (Queensland, New South Wales)
 A. platnickorum Rix & Harvey, 2011 — Australia (New South Wales)
 A. raveni Rix & Harvey, 2011 — Australia (Queensland)
 A. smithae Rix & Harvey, 2011 — Australia (New South Wales)
 A. tealei Rix & Harvey, 2012 — Australia (Queensland)
 A. thompsoni Rix & Harvey, 2012 — Australia (Queensland)
 A. wallacei Rix & Harvey, 2012 — Australia (Queensland)
 A. westi Rix & Harvey, 2012 — Australia (Queensland)
 A. woodae Rix & Harvey, 2012 — Australia (Queensland)

B

† Baltarchaea

† Baltarchaea Eskov, 1992 - Archaeinae
 † B. conica Koch and Berendt, 1854

† Burmesarchaea

† Burmesarchaea Wunderlich, 2008 - Archaeinae

E

† Eoarchaea

† Eoarchaea Forster and Platnick, 1984 - Archaeinae
 † E. hyperoptica Menge, 1854 
 † E. vidua Wunderlich, 2004

Eriauchenus

Eriauchenus O. Pickard-Cambridge, 1881
 E. andriamanelo Wood & Scharff, 2018 — Madagascar
 E. andrianampoinimerina Wood & Scharff, 2018 — Madagascar
 E. bourgini (Millot, 1948) — Madagascar
 E. fisheri (Lotz, 2003) — Madagascar
 E. goodmani Wood & Scharff, 2018 — Madagascar
 E. harveyi Wood & Scharff, 2018 — Madagascar
 E. lukemacaulayi Wood & Scharff, 2018 — Madagascar
 E. mahariraensis (Lotz, 2003) — Madagascar
 E. milajaneae Wood & Scharff, 2018 — Madagascar
 E. milloti Wood & Scharff, 2018 — Madagascar
 E. pauliani (Legendre, 1970) — Madagascar
 E. rafohy Wood & Scharff, 2018 — Madagascar
 E. ranavalona Wood & Scharff, 2018 — Madagascar
 E. rangita Wood & Scharff, 2018 — Madagascar
 E. ratsirarsoni (Lotz, 2003) — Madagascar
 E. rixi Wood & Scharff, 2018 — Madagascar
 E. sama Wood & Scharff, 2018 — Madagascar
 E. workmani O. Pickard-Cambridge, 1881 (type) — Madagascar
 E. wunderlichi Wood & Scharff, 2018 — Madagascar
 E. zirafy Wood & Scharff, 2018 — Madagascar

M

Madagascarchaea

Madagascarchaea Wood & Scharff, 2018
 M. ambre (Wood, 2008) — Madagascar
 M. anabohazo (Wood, 2008) — Madagascar
 M. borimontsina (Wood, 2008) — Madagascar
 M. fohy Wood & Scharff, 2018 — Madagascar
 M. gracilicollis (Millot, 1948) (type) — Madagascar
 M. griswoldi (Wood, 2008) — Madagascar
 M. halambohitra (Wood, 2008) — Madagascar
 M. jeanneli (Millot, 1948) — Madagascar
 M. lavatenda (Wood, 2008) — Madagascar
 M. legendrei (Platnick, 1991) — Madagascar
 M. lotzi Wood & Scharff, 2018 — Madagascar
 M. moramora Wood & Scharff, 2018 — Madagascar
 M. namoroka (Wood, 2008) — Madagascar
 M. rabesahala Wood & Scharff, 2018 — Madagascar
 M. spiceri (Wood, 2008) — Madagascar
 M. tsingyensis (Lotz, 2003) — Madagascar
 M. vadoni (Millot, 1948) — Madagascar
 M. voronakely (Wood, 2008) — Madagascar

† Myrmecarchaea

† Myrmecarchaea Wunderlich, 2004 - Archaeinae
 † M. pediculus Wunderlich, 2004 
 † M. petiolus Wunderlich, 2004

P

† Patarchaea

† Patarchaea Selden et al., 2008 - Archaeinae
 † P. muralis Selden et al., 2008

S

† Saxonarchaea

† Saxonarchaea Wunderlich, 2004 - Archaeinae
 † S. dentata Wunderlich, 2004 
 † S. diabolica Wunderlich, 2004

Z

Zephyrarchaea

Zephyrarchaea Rix & Harvey, 2012
 Z. austini Rix & Harvey, 2012 — Australia (South Australia)
 Z. barrettae Rix & Harvey, 2012 — Australia (Western Australia)
 Z. grayi Rix & Harvey, 2012 — Australia (Victoria)
 Z. janineae Rix & Harvey, 2012 — Australia (Western Australia)
 Z. mainae (Platnick, 1991) (type) — Australia (Western Australia)
 Z. marae Rix & Harvey, 2012 — Australia (Victoria)
 Z. marki Rix & Harvey, 2012 — Australia (Western Australia)
 Z. melindae Rix & Harvey, 2012 — Australia (Western Australia)
 Z. porchi Rix & Harvey, 2012 — Australia (Victoria)
 Z. robinsi (Harvey, 2002) — Australia (Western Australia)
 Z. vichickmani Rix & Harvey, 2012 — Australia (Victoria)

References

Archaeidae